ProSAS is a database describing the effects of splicing on the structure of a protein

See also
 Alternative splicing
 Protein structure

References

External links
 http://www.bio.ifi.lmu.de/ProSAS.

Biological databases
Gene expression
Protein structure
RNA splicing
Spliceosome